The third season of the Brazilian competitive reality television series MasterChef premiered on March 15, 2016 at 10:30 p.m. on Band.

Entrepreneur Leonardo Young won the competition over teacher Bruna Chaves on August 23, 2016.

Contestants

Top 21
Source:

Elimination table

: Bruna won the Mystery Box challenge and advanced directly to the Top 4, while Leonardo was selected the bottom entry and was not eligible to compete in the first round of the Elimination Test. Raquel won the first round and also advanced to the Top 4, leaving Fabio, Leonardo and Luriana in the bottom three. Leornado won the second and final round, while Fabio was eliminated over Luriana.

Key

Ratings and reception

Brazilian ratings
All numbers are in points and provided by IBOPE.

Note: Episode 3 aired against the Paraguay  vs. Brazil football match for the 2018 FIFA World Cup qualification.
Note: Episode 4 aired against the season finale of Big Brother Brasil 16.
Note: Episode 15 aired against the season finale of Power Couple Brasil.
Note: Episode 23 aired against the South Africa vs. Brazil group match for the Women's football tournament at the 2016 Summer Olympics.
Note: Episode 24 aired against the Brazil vs. China quarterfinal match for the Women's volleyball tournament at the 2016 Summer Olympics.

References

External links
 MasterChef on Band.com
 

2016 Brazilian television seasons
MasterChef (Brazilian TV series)